Konstantinos Theodoropoulos (Greek: Κωνσταντίνος Θεοδωρόπουλος; born 27 March 1990) is a Greek professional footballer who plays as a goalkeeper for Super League 2 club AEL.

Career

Return to AEL 
On 1 July 2021, AEL announced his return to the club.

Career statistics 
As of 30 April 2017

References 

1990 births
Living people
Super League Greece players
Football League (Greece) players
Super League Greece 2 players
Ionikos F.C. players
Athlitiki Enosi Larissa F.C. players
Asteras Tripolis F.C. players
AO Chania F.C. players
Doxa Drama F.C. players
Greek footballers
Panionios F.C. players
Apollon Pontou FC players
Footballers from Larissa
PAS Lamia 1964 players
Association football goalkeepers